Aquatics at the 1995 Southeast Asian Games included swimming, diving and water polo events and were held at Aquatic Centre in 700th Anniversary Sport Complex, Chiang Mai, Thailand. Aquatics events was held between 10 December to 15 December.

Medal winners

Swimming
Men's events

Women's events

Diving

Water polo

See also
List of Southeast Asian Games records in swimming

References
CMSOC (1995) 18th SEA Games Official Report, Thailand

1995
1995 Southeast Asian Games events
1995 in water sports